Hofesh Shechter  (born 3 May 1975) is an Israeli choreographer, dancer and composer based in London. He is best known for being the founder and artistic director of the Hofesh Shechter Company.

Shechter was nominated for the Tony Award for Best Choreography in 2016 for his work on Bartlett Sher's revival of Fiddler on the Roof. Since 2016, he has been named as one of The Stage's 100 most influential people in theatre.

Early life
Hofesh Shechter was born in Jerusalem, Israel, in 1975. At 6, Shechter began to study piano, later developing an interest in folk dance aged 12. At 15, he successfully auditioned for the Jerusalem Academy of Music and Dance as a pianist, but switched to dance upon his arrival, taking formal classes in ballet and modern dance.

Whilst still training as a dancer, Shechter was conscripted into the Israel Defence Forces on his eighteenth birthday. He later described this experience as "like an electrical short circuit in my brain".

Midway through the compulsory three years of his training, he moved to Tel Aviv when he was accepted as a junior into the Batsheva Dance Company. To complete his army duty, Shechter was given an evening clerical job, and would train with Batsheva by day.

Shechter graduated to the main company, where he danced in works by Ohad Naharin and Wim Vandekeybus, amongst others, whilst also studying percussion. After three years, Shechter left the company in order to play drums in a rock group, The Human Beings, and study music in Paris. In 2002, he moved to London to perform with the Jasmin Vardimon Company, creating Fragments in 2003 on an interim with the company. Shechter also composed the music for the production.

Shechter was then commissioned by The Place Prize in 2004 to create Cult, winning the Audience Choice Award. Further works include Uprising in 2006, In Your Rooms, which he expanded in 2007 to work for the three venues The Place, the Southbank Centre and Sadler's Wells, and The Art of Not Looking Back in 2009, for an all-female cast. In 2008 he choreographed the dance sequence that opened the second series of Skins. He formed the Hofesh Shechter Dance Company in 2008.

Major works
Fragments (2003)
Cult (2004)
Uprising (2006)
In your rooms (2007)
The Art of Not Looking Back (2009)
Political Mother (2010)
Survivor (2012), commissioned by The Barbican, co-staged by Antony Gormley 
Sun (2013)
Political Mother: The Choreographer's Cut (2014) 
Untouchable (2015), commissioned by The Royal Ballet
Orphee et Eurydice (2015), Royal Opera House Production 
Barbarians (2015)
Clowns (2016), for Nederlands Dans Theater 
Fiddler on the Roof (2016), Broadway revival 
Grand Finale (2017)
Show (2018) 
Political Mother Unplugged (2020)
Double Murder (2021)

Personal life
Shechter has lived in the UK since 2002.

Awards
In 2018, Shechter was awarded an honorary OBE in the Queen's Birthday Honours.

References

1975 births
People from Jerusalem
Honorary Officers of the Order of the British Empire
Israeli male ballet dancers
Israeli choreographers
Living people